Princess Sara bint Faisal of Jordan (born 27 March 1997) is the daughter of Prince Faisal bin Hussein and Princess Alia, and a niece of King Abdullah II of Jordan. She is the younger sister of Princess Ayah and Prince Omar, and is also the twin of Princess Aisha. Princess Sara currently attends Amman Baccalaureate School.

Princess Sarah rarely makes public appearances in the media, but in September 2021 she and her twin sister Aisha met up with the Lebanese journalist Ricardo Karam in Amman.

Ancestry

References

External links 
Jordanian royal family information

Living people
1997 births
House of Hashim
Jordanian twins
Jordanian princesses
Jordanian people of English descent